Professor John Kirowan is a fictional character from Robert E. Howard's contributions to H.P. Lovecraft's story cycle "the Cthulhu Mythos".

Kirowan is often partnered with the character John Conrad, to the extent that these stories are often referred to under the group title Conrad & Kirowan.  Professor Kirowan is a younger son of a titled Irish family and a scholar of the Mythos who travelled widely in search of forbidden knowledge. His ancestor, Sir Michael Kirowan was a medieval knight famous for killing a particularly fierce and notorious villain, whose ghost Kirowan will meet and escape from.

In Budapest he studied with a man called Yosef Vrolok but refused to "descend to the foul depths of forbidden occultism and diabolism to which [he] sank".  In revenge, Vrolok used his "vile arts" to turn" the only woman Kirowan ever loved",  against him and "debauched" her.  In order to have his own revenge, Kirowan travelled the world seeking greater knowledge of the occult but became sickened by what he learned and renounced this knowledge.

In later life he joined the Wanderer's Club, "which is composed of the drift of the world, travelers, eccentrics, and all manner of men whose paths lie outside
the beaten tracks of life."

The story The Haunter of the Ring provides much of Kirowan's background as well as establishing a link to Howard's Conan stories.  The ring of the title is Thoth-Amon's Serpent Ring of Set, first mentioned in the short story The Phoenix on the Sword.  Kirowan states that it has been "handed down by foul cults of sorcerers since the days of forgotten Stygia."

Stories
The Children of the Night: First printed in Weird Tales (Apr-May 1931)
The Thing on the Roof: First printed in Weird Tales (Feb 1932) 
The Haunter of the Ring: First printed in Weird Tales (June 1934) 
Dig Me No Grave: First printed in Weird Tales (Feb 1937)
Dermod's Bane: First printed in The Magazine of Horror (Fall 1967) 
The Dwellers Under the Tombs: First printed in 1976
Dagon Manor: First printed in 1986, fragment completed by C. J. Henderson

References

External links
Ghostbreakers: John Conrad/Professor Kirowan
Conrad & Kirowan at the Works of Robert E. Howard
Chronologies of the Wold Newton Universe: John Kirowan

Characters in pulp fiction
Literary characters introduced in 1931
Fictional professors
Cthulhu Mythos characters
Robert E. Howard characters
Fictional Irish people